The Procellaris Agrotis noctuid moth (Agrotis procellaris) is a species of moth in the family Erebidae.

This moth is endemic to Laysan Island, in the Northwestern Hawaiian Islands.

References

Agrotis - Encyclopaedia of Life
Laysan Extinct species

Agrotis
Endemic moths of Hawaii
Taxonomy articles created by Polbot